The 1927 German Ice Hockey Championship was the 11th season of the German Ice Hockey Championship, the national championship of Germany. SC Riessersee won the championship by defeating SC Charlottenburg in the final.

First round

Semifinals

Final

References

External links
German ice hockey standings 1912-1932
Ger
German Ice Hockey Championship seasons
Ice hockey